Manoj Kumar Tiwari (born 1 February 1971) is an Indian politician, singer and actor serving as a Member of Parliament from North East Delhi. He contested the 2009 general election as a Samajwadi Party candidate from Gorakhpur Lok Sabha but lost to Yogi Adityanath. Again, he contested 2014 Indian general elections as a Bharatiya Janata Party (BJP) candidate and won. He was appointed as Delhi BJP president in 2016. He was the head of the BJP organisation in Delhi when the party recorded a record victory in 2017 MCD elections. He was a contestant in Bigg Boss season 4.

Early life
Born on 1 February 1971 in Kabir Chaura locality of Varanasi in Uttar Pradesh, Tiwari is one of the six children of Chandradev Tiwari and Lalita Devi. He is from Atarwalia, a small village in Kaimur district of Bihar. Tiwari completed his M.P.Ed. degree from Banaras Hindu University.

Career
Prior to his involvement in politics, he had spent years as a singer and an actor in the Bhojpuri film industry.

In 2003, he took a role in the film Sasura Bada Paisawala. He followed this with the films Daroga Babu I Love You and Bandhan Toote Na.

The BBC reported in 2005 that Tiwari and Ravi Kishan were the biggest male stars in the Bhojpuri cinema market and that Tiwari charged around  90,000 per film.

In 2010, Tiwari was a contestant in the fourth season of reality television show Bigg Boss.

Manoj Tiwari also sang "Jiya Ho Bihar Ke Lala Jiya Tu Haazar Sala" in Gangs of Wasseypur.

Politics
In 2009, Tiwari contested elections for the 15th Lok Sabha as a candidate for the Samajwadi Party in the Gorakhpur constituency. He had been offered a choice of three constituencies and Zeenews reported him as saying that he was not "a political person but was concerned for the development of Purvanchal region of Uttar Pradesh." He lost to Yogi Adityanath.

His house in Mumbai was allegedly attacked in November 2009 by an irate mob about remarks that they claimed he had made about Shiv Sena. Tiwari denied the allegations.

In January 2011 Mid-Day reported that the BJP might invite him to join their party and that the association with him would assist their electoral efforts among North Indians. Tiwari dismissed the story as being hypothetical, although he would consider his options should an invitation emerge. He had been seen with BJP leaders at an event and had expressed admiration for Shatrughan Sinha, the BJP MP for Patna Sahib.

Tiwari has supported Ramdev's hunger strike at the Ramlila Ground protests and protested the arrest of Anna Hazare.

He won the North East Delhi (Lok Sabha constituency) in the 2014 Indian general elections from BJP. He defeated Anand Kumar from AAP with a margin of 1,44,084 votes.

In 2019 general elections, Tiwari, a BJP candidate won against Indian National Congress candidate Sheila Dikshit in North East Delhi constituency of New Delhi by a margin of 3.63 lakh votes.

The Delhi government had decided to stop the production, storage, sale, and use of all types of firecrackers to reduce the rising levels of pollution in Delhi. In September 2022, Tiwari moved the Supreme Court against the Delhi government. Tiwari said that that freedom of religion cannot be taken away under the pretext of the right to life. Supreme Court refused to provide an early hearing for the petition and dismissed the plea saying "Let People Breathe Clean Air". SC also asked the public to use the money on sweets instead of crackers.

Personal life 
Manoj Tiwari married his first wife Rani Tiwari in 1999. They have a daughter together named Rhiti. In 2011, Manoj and Rani were involved in divorce proceedings, after 11 years of marriage. They divorced in 2012. 

He later married Surbhi, with whom he has two daughters. The first daughter born on 30 December 2020 and second on 12 December 2022.

Filmography

Sasura Bada Paisawala (2003) as Raja
Daroga Babu I Love You (2004)
Humke Maafi Dei Da (2004)
Bandhan Toote Na (2005) as Kishan
Dharti Putra (2005)
Raja Thakur (2006)
Dharti Kahe Pukar Ke (2006) as Arjun
Damadji (2006)
Dehati Babu (2006) as Mangru
Ganga (2006) as Bajrangi
Naihar Ke Maado Piya Ke Chunari (2007)
Munna Pandey Berojgaar (2007)
Tu Hamaar Hau (2007)
Janam Janam Ke Saath (2007)
Gangotri:Ganga 2 (2007) as Bajrangi
Bhole Shankar (2008) as Bhole
International Daroga (2008)
Deshdrohi (2008) as Shekhar
Ae Bhouji Ke Sister (2009)
Elaan (2011)
Gobar Singh (2013)
Devra Bhail Deewana (2014)

Television

References

External links

 

1971 births
Living people
People from Varanasi
Singers from Bihar
Male actors from Bihar
Male actors in Bhojpuri cinema
Indian male playback singers
Bhojpuri-language film directors
Male actors in Hindi cinema
Indian television presenters
21st-century Indian film directors
India MPs 2014–2019
Indian actor-politicians
21st-century Indian male actors
Lok Sabha members from Delhi
People from Kaimur district
Bharatiya Janata Party politicians from Delhi
Bigg Boss (Hindi TV series) contestants
India MPs 2019–present
National Democratic Alliance candidates in the 2019 Indian general election